Alla Fedynitch (born 18 June 1979) is a German bassist. She currently plays in Eyes of Eden and Neon Sunrise. She was a member of Leaves' Eyes, touring member of Disillusion and also played previously live with Pain.

Discography 
Leaves' Eyes – Njord (2009)
Eyes of Eden – Faith (2007)
Atrocity – Werk 80 II (2008)
Enemy of the Sun – Shadows (2007)
Neon Sunrise – Toxigenesis (2004)

References

External links 
Picture of Alla Fedynitch on the Eyes of Eden website
Official Facebook
Discogs profile

Women bass guitarists
German heavy metal bass guitarists
Russian bass guitarists
Eyes of Eden members
1979 births
Living people
Leaves' Eyes members
21st-century women musicians
21st-century bass guitarists
German women guitarists
Women in metal